Baramulla district or Varmul (in Kashmiri)  is one of the 20 districts in the Indian union territory of Jammu and Kashmir. Baramulla town is the administrative headquarters of this district. Muslims constitute about 98% of the population among which Shia Muslims form 30-35% and Sunni Muslims form 65-70%.

Etymology
The name Baramulla, meaning "Boar's Molar Place," is derived from two Sanskrit words Varaha (Boar) and Mula. According to Hindu texts, the Kashmir Valley was once a lake called Satisaras, the lake of Parvati (consort of Shiva). Brahmin texts state that the lake was occupied by a demon, Jalodbhava, until Lord Vishnu assumed the form of a boar and struck the mountain with his molar at Baramulla (ancient Varahamula). He bored an opening in it where the lake water flowed out.

History

Ancient and medieval
The city of Baramulla, from which the district derives its name, was founded by Raja Bhimsina in 2306 BCE.

A number of prominent visitors have travelled to Baramulla. These include the Chinese visitor Heiun T'Sang and the British historian, Moorcraft. Mughal emperors had a special fascination for Baramulla. As the gateway of the Kashmir Valley, Baramulla was a stopping place for them during their visits to the valley. Jahangir also stayed at Baramulla during his visit to Kashmir in 1620 CE.

From the very beginning, Baramulla has been a religious center. The construction of Hindu Teerth and Buddhist Vihars made the city sacred to people of both religions. In the 15th century, the noted Muslim saint, Syed Janbaz Wali, visited the valley along with his companions in 1421 CE. He chose Baramulla as the centre of his mission and was buried here after death. His shrine attracts pilgrims from all over the Valley. In 1620, the sixth Sikh Guru Shri Hargobind visited the city. Baramulla thus became an abode of Hindus, Muslims, Buddhists and Sikhs living in harmony and contributing to a rich composite culture.

It was the oldest and the most important town in the north of princely state of Kashmir and Jammu. In the later centuries, until 27 October 1947, it was the 'Gateway of Kashmir Valley' by the Rawalpindi-Murree-Muzaffarabad-Baramulla Road. It became a part of Union of India when the Maharaja, under duress of invasion by Pakistani tribal forces, signed the instrument of accession on 26 October 1947, which was accepted by India the next day.
Actual area of district Baramulla according to 2018 survey by the centre for remote sensing and gis is 2204.06 km2.

Pakistani tribal invasion (1947) 

After the Partition of India in 1947, Maharaja Hari Singh chose to remain independent, not joining either India or Pakistan.

A large number of tribals from Pakistan attacked Kashmir under the code name "Operation Gulmarg," intending to seize Kashmir. The invading tribals started moving along Rawalpindi-Murree-Muzaffarabad-Baramulla Road on 22 October 1947 with Pakistani army men in plain clothes. Muzaffarabad fell on 24 October 1947. They reached and captured Baramulla on 25 October. There they stayed for several days looting, raping, and killing residents; burning and plundering homes and businesses; and desecrating and vandalising shrines and temples. They could have reached Srinagar, just 50 km away, and captured its airfield, which was not defended at all. They raped and killed European nuns (only one survived) at Baramulla's St. Joseph convent and Christian nurses at the missionary hospital. This looting, raping, murder and abduction of girls continued for several days. It is said that the suffering of Baramulla saved the rest of Kashmir, because airplanes carrying Indian troops airlifted from Delhi on the morning of 27 October could land at Srinagar airfield while the invaders were still at Baramulla.

Charles Chevenix Trench writes in his The Frontier Scouts (1985):
In October 1947... tribal lashkars hastened in lorries - undoubtedly with official logistic support - into Kashmir... at least one British Officer, Harvey-Kelly took part in the campaign. It seemed that nothing could stop these hordes of tribesmen taking Srinagar with its vital airfield. Indeed nothing did, but their own greed. The Mahsuds in particular stopped to loot, rape and murder; Indian troops were flown in and the lashkars pushed out of the Vale of Kashmir into the mountains. The Mahsuds returned home in a savage mood, having muffed an easy chance, lost the loot of Srinagar and made fools of themselves.

Tom Cooper of Air Combat Information Group wrote:
...the Pathans appeared foremost interested in looting, killing, ransacking and other crimes against the inhabitants instead of a serious military action.

Biju Patnaik (who later became Chief Minister of Odisha) piloted the first plane to land at Srinagar airport that morning. He brought 17 soldiers of 1-Sikh regiment commanded by Lt. Col. Dewan Ranjit Rai.
"...The pilot flew low on the airstrip twice to ensure that no raiders were around... Instructions from PM Nehru’s office were clear: If the airport was taken over by the enemy, you are not to land. Taking a full circle the DC-3 flew ground level. Anxious eye-balls peered from inside the aircraft – only to find the airstrip empty. Nary a soul was in sight. The raiders were busy distributing the war booty amongst them in Baramulla."

In the words of Gen Mohammad Akbar Khan (Brigadier-in-Charge, Pakistan, in his book War for Kashmir in 1947): "The uncouth raiders delayed in Baramulla for two (whole) days for some unknown reason."

It took two weeks for the Indian army to evict the raiders from Baramulla. Joined by Pakistani regular troops, they had become well-entrenched.

Sheikh Mohammad Abdullah spoke in the UN Security Council on 5 February 1948 thus: "...the raiders came to our land, massacred thousands of people — mostly Hindus and Sikhs, but Muslims, too — abducted thousands of girls, Hindus, Sikhs and Muslims alike, looted our property and almost reached the gates of our summer capital, Srinagar..."

Recent years
Roads have been improved and road network has grown considerably in Baramulla town since 1947. New schools and colleges have started and better facilities for education have been created. More bridges on Jhelum river have been constructed or planned to connect the old town on the north bank of the river with the new town on the south bank. Decongestion of the old town has been attempted by moving some residents to houses in the new town.

The most recent development has been creation of railway connectivity with Srinagar, Anantnag and Qazigund and the planned connectivity with Banihal and Jammu.

Administration
Baramulla district comprises sixteen tehsils: Pattan, Uri, Kreeri, Boniyar, Tangmarg, Sopore, Watergam Rafiabad, Rohama, Dangiwacha, Bomai, Dangerpora, Khoie(Panzipora), Wagoora, Kunzer, Kwarhama and Baramulla.

This district consists of 26 blocks: Uri, Rohama, Rafiabad, Zaingeer, Sopore, Boniyar, Baramulla, Tangmarg, Singhpora, Pattan, Wagoora, Kunzer, Paranpillian, Bijhama, Norkhah, Narwav, Nadihal, Kandi Rafiabad, Hardchanum, Tujjar Sharief, Sangrama, Sherabad Khore, Lalpora, Wailoo, Khaipora and Chandil Wanigam. Pattan tehsil is the largest tehsil of the district Baramulla and was later split to form a separate Kreeri tehsil.

Pattan Town is situated in the centre of the district between Srinagar and Baramulla cities and is surrounded by villages like Palhalan, Nihalpora Hanjiwera Zangam, Sherpora, Sonium and Yall. Each block consists of a number of panchayats.

Politics
Baramullah district has seven assembly constituencies: Uri, Rafiabad, Sopore, Sangrama, Baramulla, Gulmarg and Pattan.

Demographics

According to the 2011 census Baramulla district had a population of 1,008,039, or 1,015,503, roughly equal to the nation of Cyprus or the US state of Montana. This gives it a ranking of 443rd in India (out of a total of 640). Of the total population, 542,171 (53.4%) were males and 473,332 (46.6%) were females, the sex ratio being 885 females for every 1,000 males (this varies with religion), a decrease from 905 in 2001 census, and much lower than the national average of 940. The sex ratio for children in 0 to 6 year age group was even less at 866.

Its population growth rate over the decade 2001-2011 was 20.34%. Baramula has a literacy rate of 66.93%. with male literacy 77.35% and female literacy 55.01%. Total literate in Baramula district were 571,348 of which males and females were 352,289 and 219,059 respectively.

Baramulla town is the largest town in the district and the fourth most-populous town in the state, with a population of 167,986 as per 2011 census.

The most widely spoken language is Kashmiri (.11% of the population according to the 2011 census), but there are also speakers of Pahari (9.88%), Gujari (3.45%), Hindi (1.58%) and Punjabi (1.26%).

Geography and climate 
The district is spread from Srinagar district and Ganderbal district in the east to the line of control in the west, and from Kupwara district in the north and Bandipore district in the northwest to Poonch district in the south and Badgam district in the southwest. Baramulla has cool climate under Köppen climate classification. In winter, generally between December and February, snowfall occurs. Gulmurg is popular destination for tourist all over world.

Baramulla city is located on the banks of Jhelum river at the highest point of the river. The old town lies on the north (right) bank of the river and the new town lies on the south (left) bank. They are connected by five bridges, including a suspension bridge connecting Gulnar park with Dewan Bagh.

Healthcare
Baramulla has a district civil hospital and a district veterinary hospital with facilities such as radiology (x-ray) and ultrasonography. The hospital has been shifted to a new building with 300 beds in Kanthbagh in March 2013, ( In the Land of Ushkara Baramulla) which was in construction for two decades. St.Joseph's Hospital & Nursing School run by Christian Missionary Nuns Baramulla district hospital is also the associated hospital of the Government Medical College, Baramulla. There are smaller hospitals in other towns of the district and primary health centres at villages in the district. Primary Health Center Ushkara near Jamia Masjid Ushkara under Block Sheeri.

Tehsils
 

Boniyar
Dangerpora
Khoie Panzipora
Kwarhama
Watergam
Baramulla
Kreeri
Kunzer
Pattan
Sopore
Tangmarg
Uri
Wagoora
Dangiwacha
Rohama
Zaingeer

References

External links

 Baramulla district official website

 
2005 Kashmir earthquake
Districts of Jammu and Kashmir